Jacqueline Dor (1929–1972) was a French film actress.

Selected filmography
 Monsieur de Falindor (1947)
 Scandals of Clochemerle (1948)
 Three Boys, One Girl (1948)
 Cage of Girls (1949)
 Emile the African (1949)
 Rome Express (1950)

References

Bibliography
 Goble, Alan. The Complete Index to Literary Sources in Film. Walter de Gruyter, 1999.

External links

1929 births
1972 deaths
French film actresses
People from Boulogne-sur-Mer
20th-century French women